Zrće is a long pebble beach on the Adriatic island of Pag and is located on the Dalmatian coast. It is one of over 100 Blue Flag beaches in Croatia, having received the award back in 2003.

Zrće beach is a Croatian summer destination for partygoers, with many discotheques and beach bars operating during summer months. It regularly features house, EDM, hardstyle, r'n'b, hip-hop and trance DJs at the peak of the Croatian summer season. Zrće Beach are home to clubs as: Aquarius, Kalypso, Papaya, and Noa Beach club.  Activities include bungee jumping, jet-ski, party boats and inflatable catapults.

References

Zrce Beach, official Page

External links
Zrce Beach
Tourist Board of Novalja

Beaches of Croatia
Entertainment districts
Landforms of Lika-Senj County
Pag (island)